The General Council of Bucharest (Romanian: Consiliul General al Municipiului București; also known as the Consiliul Popular al Municipiului București from 1968 to 1989) is the legislative body of the Municipality of Bucharest, and is made up of 55 councillors elected every four years.

Together with the Mayor of Bucharest and the Deputy Mayor, the General Council makes up the General City Hall of Bucharest, which is responsible for citywide affairs, such as the water system, the transport system and the main boulevards. Bucharest is also divided into six sectors, each of which has their own 27-seat Sectorial Council and Mayor, and is responsible for local area affairs, such as secondary streets, parks, schools, and the cleaning services.

Structure

2020–2024

2021–present

2020–2021

2016–2020

2012–2016

2008–2012

2004–2008

2007–2008

2004–2007

2000–2004

1996–2000

1992–1996

1990–1992

References

Politics of Bucharest
Bucharest